Gavrilo I Rajić (died 1659) was Archbishop of Peć and Serbian Patriarch between 1648 and 1655. He was murdered by Turks and therefore celebrated by the Eastern Orthodox Church as a hieromartyr. His feast day is celebrated on December 13.

Metropolitan
Gavrilo was born around 1605–1610 in the region of Stari Vlah (present-day Serbia) into the noble Rajić family. He entered into church service and became Metropolitan of Smederevo. In 1643, he was elected Metropolitan of Raška.  Around 1644, he rebuilt the Monastery of the Holy Archangels in the Kovilje Mountains. After the death of Serbian Patriarch Pajsije on November 3/13 1647, Gavrilo was elected new patriarch in 1648.

Patriarch
In 1653, he decided to travel to Russia to ask for material support for the Serbian Patriarchate of Peć. After meeting with Metropolitan Arsenije of Herzegovina on Christmas Eve, he went first to Wallachia and arrived in Trgovište where he tried to reconcile the Wallachian Prince Matei Basarab with the Cossack Hetman Bohdan Khmelnytsky. From there, Gavrilo traveled to Russia in 1654, taking with him two books for printing: Lives of Serbian Emperors and Patriarchs and Typikon against Latin Heresy of Saint Nil Kabasilas.  He was welcomed by Russian Patriarch Nikon and Russian Tsar Michael Romanov. He also participated in the famous Moscow Synod in 1658 which approved Nikon's reforms. Since he decided to stay in Russia, he wrote to Serbian metropolitans to elect a new patriarch.

Soon after, he changed his mind and left Russia arriving back in the Ottoman Empire in 1659. Upon return, he was accused by the Turks of being responsible for the Russo-Turkish War. he was also accused of attempting to convert some Turks to Christianity. Brought before the tribunal, he was ordered to embrace Islam. After Gavrilo refused, he was sentenced to death. He was executed in Bursa on July 18, 1659. Presbyter Pavle took his remains and buried them.  He was entered on the list of Serbian saints.

See also
 List of Serbian saints

References

Sources

External links
 Official site of the Serbian Orthodox Church: Serbian Archbishops and Patriarchs 

Gavrilo I
1659 deaths
17th-century Serbian people
Serbian saints of the Eastern Orthodox Church
Persecution of Christians in the Ottoman Empire
Persecution of Eastern Orthodox Christians